The Georgetown Hoyas football team represents Georgetown University in the Division I Football Championship Subdivision level of college football. Like other sports teams from Georgetown, the team is named the Hoyas, which derives from the chant, Hoya Saxa. They play their home games at Cooper Field on the Georgetown University campus in Washington, D.C. Their best season in the recent era was produced in 2011 when the team, produced an 8-3 record.

History

The first football team at Georgetown was formed on November 1, 1874, with the earliest recorded intercollegiate games dating to 1887. By the 1940s, Georgetown played in the Orange Bowl, where they lost 14–7 to Mississippi State.

As the college game became more expensive after World War II, Georgetown's program began to lose money rapidly. The Hoyas' last successful season was 1949, when they lost in the Sun Bowl against Texas Western.

After a 2–7 season in 1950, Georgetown attempted to salvage its program by softening its schedule, replacing major opponents such as Penn State, Miami, and Tulsa with Richmond, Bucknell, and Lehigh.  The program was losing too much money, however, and on March 22, 1951 the University's president canceled the football program.

In 1962, Georgetown allowed its students to start a football program as an exhibition-only club sport. New games began in 1964, with their first match drawing 8,000 spectators to see the Hoyas host another university with an unofficial program, New York University (NYU).  Varsity football resumed in 1970 at what later became known as the Division III level. In 1976, Georgetown began an annual rivalry game with the Catholic University Cardinals for the Steven Dean Memorial Trophy. The competition ended in 1993, when Georgetown moved into the Division I Football Championship Subdivision because of NCAA legislation forbidding Division I or II schools from playing football in lower divisions.

In 1993, the team joined the Metro Atlantic Athletic Conference, a mostly Catholic conference on the East Coast. With eight wins, the team won the conference championship outright in 1997, and were co-champions in 1998 with nine wins. 

In 2001 the team joined the Patriot League, with the lowest football budget in the league. In 2012, the Patriot League transitioned to 60 full scholarships but Georgetown remained non-scholarship, further hurting its competitiveness in that conference. The Hoyas have posted just one winning season since 2000, an 8-3 record in 2011, just prior to the Patriot League's decision to add scholarships. Head coach Kevin Kelly was named the conference Coach of the Year.

Classifications
1937–1950: NCAA University Division
1951–1963: No team
1964–1969: National Club Football Association
1970–1972: NCAA Division II
1973–1992: NCAA Division III
1993–present: NCAA Division I–AA/FCS

Conference memberships
1887–1906: Independent
1907–1921: South Atlantic Intercollegiate Athletic Association
1922–1950: Independent
1951–1963: No team
1964–1972: Independent
1970–1972: Division II Independent
1973–1992: Division III Independent
1993–1999: Metro Atlantic Athletic Conference
2000: Division I–AA Independent
2001–present: Patriot League

Stadiums

Georgetown has played football at various on-campus intramural fields. From 1891 until 1893, the stadium known as Boundary Field played host to Georgetown football. From 1921 until 1950, Griffith Stadium played host to Georgetown football.

Currently, the Hoyas play at Cooper Field, previously called Multi-Sport Field, which was upgraded from Harbin Field in 2003. Construction on Cooper Field was sidelined for 15 years until it was completed in 2020. The facility will open in the fall of 2021 with capacity for 4,000.

D.C. Cup Rivalry Game

The Hoyas had a brief cross-town rivalry with Howard University for a title known as the DC Mayor's Cup (awarded by the mayor of Washington).  Three games were held (2008, 2009 and 2011).  The series has Georgetown leading 2–1–0 following their 2011 victory. The series was slated to resume in 2019 but Howard discontinued the series to sign a series instead with Maryland.

Conference championships
The Hoyas have won six conference championships, highlighted by a run of four conference championships in seven years, although Georgetown went 78 years without a conference championship, in part due to not being part of a conference from 1921 to 1993.

† denotes co-championship.

Bowl games
Georgetown competed in two major bowl games, including a New Year's Day bowl game.

Polling

Georgetown was ranked in the AP Poll while a member of the Major College Division.

Alumni
Perhaps the football team's most accomplished athlete was Al Blozis, who played for the NFL's New York Giants before being killed in action in World War II. Blozis's great athletic accomplishments, however, came in shot put and discus. He set the world indoor record for the shot put, throwing it 56 feet 4.5 inches in 1941. He was the national indoor and outdoor shot put champion in both 1942 and 1943.

"Big Jim" Ricca, an NFL defensive end and offensive lineman, graduated in 1949 and was the last Hoya to play in an NFL game.

Jim Schwartz, former head coach of the NFL's Detroit Lions, was a four-year letterman at linebacker. He received Distinguished Economics Graduate honors and earned numerous honors in 1988, including Division III CoSIDA/GTE Academic All-America, All-America, and team captain.

In 2007, the Washington Redskins made Alex Buzbee a reserve player, becoming the first Georgetown player on an NFL team since Ricca retired in 1956. In 2010, Buzbee joined the Toronto Argonauts of the Canadian Football League.

Comedian and actor Jim Gaffigan was a wide receiver at Georgetown in 1985 after briefly playing at Purdue.

Players in the NFL Draft

Future non-conference opponents
Announced schedules as of November 22, 2019.

References

External links

 

 
1874 establishments in Washington, D.C.
American football teams established in 1874